The Vedat Tek House is a museum and former residence of renowned Turkish architect Vedat Tek in Istanbul, Turkey. The house was built between 1913-14 by Vedat Tek for his family and himself and is a notable example of Turkish neoclassical architecture.

Location
Located across from the house is the Istanbul Military Museum and the Cemal Reşit Rey Concert Hall. Formerly across from the house was the Art deco Yayla Apartments, also designed by Tek in 1939. However, the building was demolished in 1989.

Architecture and design
Built in the Turkish Neoclassical style, the house is one of several of Tek's well known examples in this architectural movement. Turquoise tiles, arches following Islamic geometry and extrusions typical of classical Ottoman houses are the main design elements of the building. 

The house itself consists of three floors, but due to the slanted plot on which it was built, a fourth floor on ground level exists. This level is used as a restaurant.

References

Ottoman architecture in Istanbul
Buildings and structures of the Ottoman Empire
First Turkish National architecture
Buildings and structures in Istanbul
Şişli
Vedat Tek buildings
Houses completed in 1914